Bang Mae Nang is one of the six subdistricts (tambon) of Bang Yai District, in Nonthaburi Province, Thailand. Neighbouring subdistricts are (from north clockwise) Bang Khu Rat, Bang Rak Phatthana, Sao Thong Hin, Bang Muang, Bang Yai and Ban Mai. In 2020 it had a total population of 50,798 people.

Administration

Central administration
The subdistrict is subdivided into 18 administrative villages (muban).

Local administration
The area of the subdistrict is shared by two local administrative organizations.
Bang Mae Nang Town Municipality
Bang Yai Subdistrict Municipality

References

External links
Website of Bang Mae Nang Town Municipality
Website of Bang Yai Subdistrict Municipality

Tambon of Nonthaburi province
Populated places in Nonthaburi province